A Saturday night special is an inexpensive handgun.

Saturday Night Special may also refer to:

 Saturday Night Special, a 1996 television show on Fox
 "Saturday Night Special" (Lynyrd Skynyrd song), 1975
 "Saturday Night Special" (Conway Twitty song), 1988
 "Saturday Night Special", a song by The Runaways from the 1978 album And Now... The Runaways
 A single on Fad Gadget's 1981 album Incontinent
 An all-burgundy uniform worn by the Philadelphia Phillies on May 19, 1979
 Volcker's Saturday Night Special, a U.S. Federal Open Market Committee action to increase interest rates in 1979
 Saturday Night Special (album), a 1975 album by Norman Connors